Gumara River is a river of northern-western Ethiopia. Hot springs on the Gumara's banks at Wanzaye, which were popular in medicinal hot baths from the late 18th century till now, were already mentioned by missionary Henry Stern.

The river is an important spawning ground for native fish species, which include barbus, tilapia and catfish.

Notes 

Tributaries of Lake Tana
Rivers of Ethiopia